This article is a chart of mascots of all National Basketball Association (NBA) teams. Two mascots, Go the Gorilla and Rocky the Mountain Lion were ranked fourth and ninth respectively on AskMen.com's top 10 sports mascots.

Current mascots

Past mascots

Mascot of the Year
In 1997, the mascots started having an annual meeting at the NBA Mascot Conference. Since 2005, the conference also selects an individual to be honored as the top professional in the league, the Mascot of the Year.

Notes

References

External links

 
National Basketball Association
National Basketball Association lists